The Hathni Kund is a concrete barrage located on the Yamuna River in Yamuna Nagar district of Haryana state, India. It was constructed between October 1996 and June 1999 for the purpose of irrigation. The barrage diverts water into the Western and Eastern Yamuna Canals. The small reservoir created by the barrage also serves as a wetland for 31 species of waterbird.

Plans to replace the Tajewala Barrage had been in the works since the early 1970s but an agreement between the governments of Haryana and Himachal Pradesh (which share the water it diverts) was not made until July 1994. Although the barrage was completed in late 1999, it was not operational until March 2002 because of work delays.

See also

 Gurugram Bhim Kund (Hindi: गुरुग्राम भीम कुंड), also known as Pinchokhda Jhod (Hindi: पिंचोखड़ा जोहड़)
 Dakpathar Barrage
 Kaushalya Dam barrage in Pinjore 
 Bhakra Dam barrage
 Tajewala Barrage
 Okhla Barrage - Western Yamuna Canal begins here 
 Surajkund barrage
 List of National Parks & Wildlife Sanctuaries of Haryana, India
 List of dams and reservoirs in Haryana
 Western Jamuna Canal Link

References

Dams in Haryana
Yamunanagar district
Barrages in India
Dams on the Yamuna River
Dams completed in 1999
1999 establishments in Haryana
20th-century architecture in India